Astrantia major, the great masterwort, is a species of flowering plant in the family Apiaceae, native to central and eastern Europe.

Etymology
The Latin specific epithet major, meaning "larger", distinguishes this species from its smaller relative Astrantia minor.

Description
Astrantia major reaches on average  of height. The stem is erect and  glabrous, with little branches and few leaves. The basal leaves have a long petiole , 3 to 7 lobes and toothed segments. Size: . The cauline leaves are generally two, sessile, amplexicaul and  lanceolate-shaped with a trilobed apex. The small flowers are greenish-white with reddish shades. The central ones are hermaphrodite, while the external ones are male. The petals are five, white (or slightly reddened), while the stamens are five and much longer. Size of the flowers: about 1 mm. The flowering period extends from June through September.

Biochemistry
The plant also produces an essential oil that can be used in herbal medicines.

Reproduction
Astrantia major is an entomophilous plant, mainly pollinated by beetles, but also by other insects. This perennial plant reproduces itself also by means of buds present at the ground level.

Distribution
This plant is native to southern Europe (the Pyrenees, Carpathians and Balkans), but also in the Caucasus up to Anatolia. 
It is found in the countries of Albania, Austria, Belarus, Bulgaria, Czechoslovakia, France, Germany, Greece, Hungary, Italy, North Caucasus, Poland, Romania, Spain, Switzerland, Ukraine and Yugoslavia.

It has been in the British Isles since the 16th century. It has also naturalized in Shropshire near Stokesay Castle, and in Worcestershire.

Subspecies
 Astrantia major subsp. carinthiaca  : Larger umbels  (4–5 cm in diameter) widespread mainly in the eastern Alps.
 Astrantia major var. involucrata  
 Astrantia major subsp. elatior : bracts with 5 nerves and with notched apex; teeth of the calyx are very long; widespread in the Apennines.
 Astrantia caucasica Auct. Fl.Ital non Sprengel 
 Astrantia major subsp. major
 Astrantia major subsp. biebersteinii  (with synonyms of Astrantia biebersteinii ,Astrantia colchica , Astrantia intermedia , Astrantia neglecta , Astrantia orientalis , Astrantia ossica  and Astrantia trifida )

Kew only accepts (in 2022); Astrantia major subsp. apenninica , Astrantia major subsp. carinthiaca , Astrantia major subsp. elatior , Astrantia major subsp. major and Astrantia major subsp. pyrenaica

Cultivation
Many strains of Astrantia major grow well in the garden, given some shade and moisture. Their flowerheads provide summer colour in shades of red, pink and white. The following cultivars have gained the Royal Horticultural Society's Award of Garden Merit:-
 A. major 'Roma' 
 'Sunningdale Variegated' 

Other cultivars include:-

 'Abbey Road'
 'Ruby Cloud'
 'Rubra'
 'Snow Star'
 'Lars'
 'Moulin Rouge'
 'Star of Heaven'
 'Rosea'
 'Princess Sturdza'
 'Venice'
 'Magnum Blush'
 'Star of Beauty'
 'Vanilla Gorilla'
 'Roma'
 'Hadspen Blood' (a hybrid crossed with Astrantia maxima)
 'Shaggy' (previously 'Margey Fish')

Gallery

References

External links

 Pignatti S. - Flora d'Italia (3 voll.) - Edagricole – 1982
 Tutin, T.G. et al. - Flora Europaea, second edition - 1993
 Conti F., Abbate G., Alessandrini A., Blasi C., 2005. An annotated checklist of the Italian vascular flora, Palombi Editore
 Biolib
 Astrantia major
 Acta Plantarum
  Sunningdale Variegated

Apioideae
Flora of Western Asia
Flora of Europe
Flora of the Pyrenees
Plants described in 1753
Taxa named by Carl Linnaeus